University of Cincinnati Press is a university press operated by the University of Cincinnati. The press is a member of both the Library Publishing Coalition and the Association of University Presses (having been accepted into both in 2017), and it is also an ambassador for the Ohio Library and Information Network's (OhioLINK) Affordable Learning initiative.

History 
In 1901, Charles Phelps Taft gifted the University of Cincinnati $5,500 to purchase a printing press, whereupon the university began to issue publications marked with the "University of Cincinnati Press" imprint. Works released by the press at this time included monographs and textbooks, as well as the University of Cincinnati Record (a bi-monthly periodical focused on university news) and University Studies (a bi-monthly publication showcasing the work of University of Cincinnati faculty). This iteration of the press ceased to publish in 1908, and the printing press itself was sold in 1914.

The modern version of the press was announced in 2016 before officially launching in January 2017. In mid-2017, the press launched the Cincinnati Library Publishing Services (CLiPS) imprint to publish open-access textbooks and academic journals. Distribution for the University of Cincinnati Press is handled by the University of Chicago Press's Chicago Distribution Center.

See also

 List of English-language book publishing companies
 List of university presses

Notes

References

External links 
University of Cincinnati Press

Publishing companies established in 2017
University of Cincinnati
University of Cincinnati Press